The Shakti Pitha or the Shakti Peethas (seat of Shakti) are significant shrines and pilgrimage destinations in Shaktism, the goddess-centric denomination in Hinduism. The shrines are dedicated to various forms of Adi Shakti. Various Puranas such as Srimad Devi Bhagavatam state the existence of varying number of 51, 52, 64 and 108 Shakti peethas of which 18 are named as Astadasha Maha (major) in medieval Hindu texts.

Various legends explain how the Shakti Peetha came into existence. The most popular is based on the story of the death of the goddess Sati. Out of grief and sorrow, Lord Shiva carried Sati's body, reminiscing about their moments as a couple, and roamed around the universe with it. Lord Vishnu had cut her body into 51 body parts, using his Sudarshana Chakra, which fell on Earth to become sacred sites where all the people can pay homage to the Goddess. To complete this massively long task, Lord Shiva took the form of Bhairava.

Most of these historic places of goddess worship are in India, also in but there are seven in Bangladesh, three in Pakistan, three in Nepal, and one each in Tibet and Sri Lanka. There were many legends in ancient and modern sources that document this evidence. A consensus view on the number and location of the precise sites where goddess Sati's corpse fell is lacking, although certain sites are more well-regarded than others.

History

Mention in Hindu scriptures 

Brahmanda Purana, one of the major eighteen Puranas mentions 64 Shakti Peetha of Goddess Parvati in the Bharat or Greater India including present-day India, Bhutan, Bangladesh, Nepal, Sri Lanka, some parts of Southern Tibet in China and parts of southern Pakistan. Another text which gives a listing of these shrines, is the Shakti Peetha Stotram, written by Adi Shankara, the 9th-century Hindu philosopher.

According to the manuscript Mahapithapurana (c. 1690–1720 CE), there are 52 such places. Among them, 23 are located in the Bengal region, 14 of these are located in what is now West Bengal, India, 1 in Baster (Chhattisgarh), while 7 are in what is now Bangladesh.

Rishi Markandeya composed the 'Devi Saptashati' or the seven hundred hymns extolling the virtues of the Divine Goddess at the shaktipeetha in Nashik. The idol is also leaning a little to the left to listen to the sage's composition. The Saptashati or the "Durga Stuti" forms an integral part in the Vedic form of Shakti worship.

The third eye of Mata Sati fell below a tree in a mortuary in the Ishan corner of Vakreshwar. This is on the bank of the north-flowing Dwarka river in the east of Baidyanath. Here Mata Sati is called Chandi Bhagwai Ugra Tara and Bhairav is called Chandrachur. This Shaktipeeth is called Tarapith in Birbhum district West bengal, India.

Shaktism legends 

According to legend, Lord Brahma had performed a yagna (Vedic ritual of fire sacrifice) to please Shakti and Shiva to aid in the creation of the universe. As a result, Goddess Shakti separated from Shiva and emerged to help Brahma. Once her purpose was fulfilled, Shakti had to be returned to Shiva. In time, Brahma's son Daksha performed several yajnas to obtain Shakti as his daughter in the form of Sati, with the motive of marrying her to Lord Vishnu.

Daksha performed a yajna with a desire to take revenge on Lord Shiva. Daksha invited all the deities to the yajna, except Shiva and Sati. The fact that she was not invited did not deter Sati's desire to attend the yajna. She expressed her desire to Shiva, who tried his best to dissuade her from going. He relented at her continued insistence, Sati went to her father's yajna. However, Sati was not given her due respect at the yajna, and had to bear witness to Daksha's insults aimed at Shiva. Anguished, Sati cursed her father and self-immolated.

Enraged at the insult and death of his spouse, Shiva in his Virabhadra avatar destroyed Daksha's yajna and cut off his head. His anger not abated and immersed in grief, Shiva then picked up the remains of Sati's body and performed the Tandava, the celestial dance of destruction, across all creation. Frightened, the other Gods requested Vishnu to intervene to stop this destruction. As a recourse, Vishnu used the Sudarshana Chakra on Sati's corpse. This caused various parts of Sati's body to fall at several spots across the world.

The history of Daksha yajna and Sati's self-immolation had immense significance in shaping the ancient Sanskrit literature and influenced the culture of India. Each of the places on Earth where Sati's body parts were known to have fell were then considered as Sakti Peethas and were deemed places of great spiritual importance. Several stories in the Puranas and other Hindu religious books refer to the Daksha yajna. It is an important incident in both Shaivism and Shaktism, and marks the replacement of Sati with Parvati, and of the beginning of Shiva's house-holder (grihastāshramī) life from an ascetic. This event is ahead of the emergence of both of the couple's children, Kartikeya and Ganesha.

Shakti Pithas 

Each temple has shrines for Shakti and Kalabhairava, and most Shakti and Kalabhairava in different Shakti Peeth have different names.

Map of Shakti Peethas

List of 4 Adi Shakti Peethas 

Some of the great religious texts like the Shiva Purana, the Devi Bhagavata, the Kalika Purana, the AshtaShakti, and Pithanirnaya Tantra recognize four major shakti Peethas (centers) / ,
<ol>
 Vimala Temple (Pada Khanda) inside the Jagannath Temple of Puri, Odisha
 Tara Tarini (Stana Khanda), near Purushottampur, Odisha
 Kamakhya Temple (Yoni Khanda), in Guwahati, Assam; and
 Kalighat Kali Temple (Mukha Khanda) in Kolkata, West Bengal

which represent respectively the parts (Khandas) foot (Pada), breasts (Stana), genitals (Yoni), and face (Mukha) Neck (Kanth) of the body of Maata Sati.

The Ashtashakti and Kalika Purana says (in Sanskrit):

"vimalā pāda khaṇḍañca stana khaṇḍañca tāriṇi ( Devi Tārā Tāriṇi )
 kāmākhyā yōni khaṇḍañca
 mukha khaṇḍañca kālikā (Dakshina Kalika)
 aṅga pratyaṅga saṅghēna
viṣṇu cakra kṣatēna ca ॥ "

विमला पाद खंडञ्च स्तन खंडञ्च तारिणी । कामाख्या योनि खंडञ्च मुख खंडञ्च कालिका ॥
अङ्ग प्रत्यङ्ग संघेन विष्णु चक्र क्षतेन च ॥

Further explaining the importance of these four Pithas, the "Brihat Samhita" also gives the location of these Pithas as (in Sanskrit)
"ṛṣikulya taṭē dēvi
 tārakasya mahāgiri
 tasya śṛṅga sthita tāriṇi
 vaśiṣṭha rājitāparā"

ऋषिकुल्य तटे देवी तारकस्य महागिरि । तस्य शृङ्ग स्थित तारिणी वशिष्ठ राजितापरा ॥

(Rushikulya is a holy river flowing on the foothill of the Tara Tarini Hill Shrine).

Apart from these 4 there are 48 other famous Peethas recognized by religious texts. According to the Pithanirnaya Tantra the 51 peethas are in the present day countries of India, Sri Lanka, Bangladesh, Nepal, Tibet, Bhutan and Pakistan. The Shivacharita besides listing 51 maha-peethas, speaks about 26 more upa-peethas. The Bengali almanac, Vishuddha Siddhanta Panjika too describes the 51 peethas including the present modified addresses. A few of the several accepted listings are given below. In South India, Srisailam in Andhra Pradesh became the site for a 2nd-century temple.

List of 18 Astadasha Maha Shakti Peethas 

There are believed to be 64 locations. Adi Shankara's Asta Dasha Shakti Peetha Stotram mentions 18 locations known as the Maha Shakti Pithas. Among these, the Shakti Peethas at Kamakhya, Gaya and Ujjain are regarded as the most sacred as they symbolize the three most important aspects of the Mother Goddess viz. Creation (Kamarupa Devi), Nourishment (Sarvamangala Devi/Mangalagauri), and Annihilation (Mahakali Devi).

Sharadha Peet is currently in ruined state. Only ruins are found in these places. Its ruins are near the Line of Control (LOC) between the Indian and Pakistani-controlled portions of the former princely state of Kashmir and Jammu. Instead, Sringeri Sharada Peetham, Sringeri in Karnataka even though not a Shakti Peetha, is this aspect of the goddess. Requests have been made by the Hindu community in Pakistan to the Pakistani government to renovate the temple, the issue being raised by former Indian Home minister L. K. Advani to the Pakistan authorities as a confidence-building measure, by increasing the people-to-people cross-border interaction.

In Skanda Purana 

As per Sankara Samhita of Sri Skanda Purana,

 Sri Sankari Peetham (Lanka)
 Sri Simhika Peetham (Simhala)
 Sri Manika Peetham (Dakshavati)
 Sri Shadkala Peetham (Peethapuram, Andhra Pradesh)
 Sri Bhramaramba Peetham (Srisailam)
 Sri Vijaya Peetham (Vijayapura)
 Sri Mahalakshmi Peetham (Kolhapuri)
 Sri padmakshi renuka (Kawadepuri)
 Sri Kamakshi Peetham (Kanchipuram)
 Sri Kuchananda Peetham (Salagrama)
 Sri Biraja Peetham (Jajpur, Odisha)
 Sri Sarala Peetham (Jhankad, Odisha)
 Sri Bhadreshwari Peetham (Harmyagiri)
 Sri Mahakali Peetham (Ujjayini)
 Sri Vindhyavasini Peetham (Vindhya mountains)
 Sri Mahayogi Peetham (Ahicchatra)
 Sri Kanyaka Peetham (Kanya Kubja)
 Sri Vishalakshi Peetham (Kashi)
 Sri Saraswati Peetham (Kashmira)
 Sri Abhirami Peetham (Padmagiri, Dindigul)

List of all Shakti Peethas 

In the listings below:

 "Shakti" refers to the Goddess worshipped at each location, all being manifestations of Dakshayani, Sati; later known as Parvati or Durga;
 "Bhairava" refers to the corresponding consort, each a manifestation of Shiva;
 "Body Part or Ornament" refers to the body part or piece of jewellery that fell to earth, at the location on which the respective temple is built.

More details on this are available in the text 'Tantrachūḍamanī' where Parvati tells these details to her son Skanda.

Other claimed Shakti Peethas 

These are not recognised as the Shakti Peethas, but still claimed by the followers, for various reasons.

1. Jwala devi Jobner

2. Jayanti Kali Temple

There are disputes about the position of this peetha. Based on most presented manuscripts and facts it is situated in jaintiapur upazila, Bangladesh, which was previously the capital of jaintia hills tribe kingdom, which became the jaintia hills district of Meghalaya, India, excluding jaintiapur. However, some people say that it is the nartiang Durga temple which is the real jayanti shaktipeeth, though there is shortage of corroborating evidences. Some other people argue the actual peetha is at Amta in West Bengal, where the Devi is worshiped as Maa Melai Chandi in Melai Chandi Mandir. But this fact can not be corroborated with any evidences. Moreover, refuting most text, in Melai Chandi Mandir the Bhairava is Durgeshwar rather than Kramadishwar. Some also relates Jayanti Devi with the Mahakal cave temple situated in the village Jayanti of Alipurduar, where many status were created by Stalagmite and Stalactite (combination of limes with water), but strong historical support is also absent here.

3. Vindhyavasini Shakti Peetha

The Vindhyavasini Shakti Peetha is considered a Shakti Peetha despite the fact that any body parts of Sati did not fall there. Vindhyavasini Devi is ultimate form of goddess , she is called as aadi shakti. Maa Vindhyavasini consists of all of the dus mahavidya & all other devi present in this universe, she is tripura sundari herself. Many legends are associated with Maa vindhyavasini, she is Mahishaasurmardani . She is combined form all the 108 shaktipeeth as Devi Bhagwath mentions. This is because it is the place where Devi chose to reside after her birth in Dvapara Yuga.
At the time of birth of Lord Krishna to Devaki and Vasudeva, the Yogamaya(Devi) took birth in Gokul to Nanda Baba and Yashoda as per instruction of Lord Vishnu.The Vasudeva replaced his son Krishna with this girl child of Yashoda. When Kansa tried to kill the girl she slipped from his hands and assumed the form of Mahadevi Adishakti. Thereafter Devi chose Vindhya Mountains as her abode to live on the earth.

See also 

 Hindu pilgrimage (yatra)
 Hindu pilgrimage sites
 List of Hindu temples
 List of Mansa Devi temples
 List of Shakti peeth in Bengal

Further reading

Notes

References

External links 
52 shakti peethas map
Comprehensive guide on 51 Shakti Peethas
Daksha Yagna – The story of Daksha's sacrifice and the origin of the Shakti Pithas

Locations in Hindu mythology
Hindu temples